This is a list of Doctor Who serials and episodes that have been released on VHS, Betamax, LaserDisc, Video 2000, and Universal Media Disc (UMD).

VHS releases
Releases on the VHS format.

First Doctor

Second Doctor

Third Doctor

Fourth Doctor

Fifth Doctor

Sixth Doctor

Seventh Doctor

Eighth Doctor

Other
The orphaned episodes of incomplete stories were released via several compilation releases:

There have also been several releases which collect together related stories and were exclusively available in these sets:
 Dalek Tin Set #1 - This release contained The Chase and Remembrance of the Daleks, and was released in September 1993
 Dalek Tin Set #2 - This release contained Planet of the Daleks and Revelation of the Daleks and was released in November 1999
 Cyberman Tin Set - This release contained The Tenth Planet and Attack of the Cybermen and was released in November 2000
 The Master Tin Set - This release contained Colony in Space and The Time Monster and was released in November 2001

Other releases have been made available which collected together previously released individual stories:
 The Davros Collection - This release contained all five stories featuring Davros; Genesis of the Daleks, Destiny of the Daleks, Resurrection of the Daleks, Revelation of the Daleks and Remembrance of the Daleks. It was released in September 2001 and was exclusive to W.H. Smiths.
 The Time Lord Collection - This release contained The War Games, The Three Doctors and The Deadly Assassin. It was released in September 2002 and was exclusive to W.H. Smiths.
 The End of the Universe Collection - This release was exclusive to the US market to celebrate the 40th anniversary and contained the last 13 stories yet to be released on VHS. These were The Sensorites, The Reign of Terror, The Time Meddler. The Gunfighters, The Faceless Ones, The Web of Fear, The Ambassadors of Death, The Mutants, Invasion of the Dinosaurs, The Invisible Enemy, The Creature from the Pit, The Horns of Nimon and Meglos. It was released in October 2003.

Betamax releases
Releases on the Betamax format.

Second Doctor

Third Doctor

Fourth Doctor

Fifth Doctor

Laserdisc releases
Between 1983 and 1997 eight LaserDiscs containing one story of the Third Doctor, four stories from the Fourth Doctor, one story from the Fifth Doctor and one story from the Eighth Doctor have been released. These discs are only playable on LaserDisc players.

Third Doctor

Fourth Doctor

Fifth Doctor

Eighth Doctor

Video 2000 releases
Releases on the Video 2000 format.

Fourth Doctor

UMD releases
In 2005, series 1 of Doctor Who was released on Universal Media Disc (UMD) format in four parts. The first part of series 4 also received a UMD release in 2009. They are only playable on Sony's PlayStation Portable and have no region locking. The releases were ultimately discontinued due to disappointing sales.

Ninth Doctor

Tenth Doctor

See also
List of Doctor Who home video releases
Lists of Doctor Who episodes
Doctor Who missing episodes
Doctor Who Restoration Team

Notes

References

Bibliography

External links
The TARDIS Library: DVDs & videos—Comprehensive database of official & unofficial Doctor Who DVD releases across the globe.
Steve Manfred's Doctor Who DVD FAQ, with full details on all North American releases. Frequently updated.

other home video
other home video
Lists of home video releases